Rimantas Šadžius (born 8 October 1960) is a Lithuanian politician of the Social Democratic Party.

Political career 
Šadžius was Minister of Finance from 2007 to 2008. In December 2012 he started a second term as minister of Finance in the cabinet of Algirdas Butkevičius. During his time in office, he served as chairman of the Party of European Socialists’ Finance Ministers Network.

Other activities
 European Investment Bank (EIB), Ex-Officio Member of the Board of Governors (2007-2008, 2012-2016)

References

External links
 

|-

1960 births
Living people
Ministers of Finance of Lithuania
Politicians from Vilnius
Social Democratic Party of Lithuania politicians